Message from Space is a 1978 Japanese science fiction film.

Message from Space may also refer to:

Message from space (science fiction), a science fiction theme
Message from Space: Galactic Wars a TV series spin-off of the film
The Third Planet from Altair, by Edward Packard, a Choose Your Own Adventure book reissued as Message from Space 
A short story, "A Message from Space" (Joseph Schlossel, Weird Tales, March 1926)

See also
Signal from Space (disambiguation)